The 1960 Missouri lieutenant gubernatorial election was held on November 8, 1960. Democratic nominee Hilary A. Bush defeated Republican nominee Harry E. Hatcher with 55.97% of the vote.

Primary elections
Primary elections were held on August 2, 1960.

Democratic primary

Candidates
Edward V. Long, incumbent Lieutenant Governor
Charles C. Shafer
Michael J. Kennedy
Lewis E. Morris

Results

Republican primary

Candidates
Harry E. Hatcher, State Senator
R. M. Battles

Results

General election

Candidates
Hilary A. Bush, Democratic
Harry E. Hatcher, Republican

Results

References

1960
Gubernatorial
Missouri